James Henry Gillis (14 May 1831 – 6 December 1910) was a rear admiral in the United States Navy.  His active-duty career extended from the 1850s through the 1890s, including service in the American Civil War.

Biography
Born in Ridgway, Pennsylvania, Gillis graduated from the Naval Academy in 1854. Three years later, while serving in store ship  he rescued the crew of a foundered Argentine ship during a violent storm. 

 
Gillis served on the frigate  at the beginning of the Civil War, he participated in the defeat of the rebel privateer Petrel on July 28, 1861 off South Carolina.

After the Civil War, he became a member of the District of Columbia Commandery of the Military Order of the Loyal Legion of the United States.

He was promoted to the rank of captain in September 1876 and to commodore in January 1887.

He commanded the South Atlantic Squadron from 1888 to 1890.  During this assignment he held the rank of acting rear admiral.  

Admiral Gillis retired from the Navy on 14 May 1893, having reached the mandatory retirement age of 62.  He was known as the "Sailor with a charmed life" because he never lost a man at sea. 

Rear Admiral Gillis died at Melbourne Beach, Florida at the age of 79.

Namesake
The destroyer  was named for him and Commodore John P. Gillis.

Dates of rank

Midshipman, 12 October, 1848. 
Passed Midshipman, 15 June, 1854. 
Master, 16 September, 1855. 
Lieutenant, 17 September, 1855. 
Lieutenant Commander, 16 July, 1862. 
Commander, 25 July, 1866. 
Captain, 30 September, 1876. 
Commodore, 29 January, 1887. 
Retired List, 14 May, 1893.

References

External links
 James H. and I. V. Gillis Naval Papers, 1866-1898 MS 4 held by Special Collections & Archives, Nimitz Library at the United States Naval Academy

1831 births
1910 deaths
United States Navy rear admirals (upper half)
United States Naval Academy alumni
People of Pennsylvania in the American Civil War
People from Ridgway, Pennsylvania
People from Melbourne Beach, Florida